Lang station can refer to:

Láng station, a metro station in Hanoi, Vietnam
Lang Southern Pacific Station, a historic train station near Santa Clarita, California, United States